Leonard Ian Abrahamson (born 30 November 1966) is an Irish film and television director. He is best known for directing independent films  Adam & Paul (2004), Garage (2007), What Richard Did (2012), and Frank (2014), and Room (2015), all of which contributed to Abrahamson's six Irish Film and Television Awards.

In 2015, he received widespread recognition for directing Room, based on the novel of the same name by Emma Donoghue. The film received four nominations  at the 88th Academy Awards including Best Picture and Best Director for Abrahamson. In 2020, he directed six episodes of and executive produced the television series Normal People, for which he was nominated for the Primetime Emmy Award for Outstanding Directing for a Limited Series.

Early life and education
Abrahamson was born in Rathfarnham, Dublin, the son of Jewish parents Edna (née Walzman) and Max Abrahamson, a solicitor. Although his upbringing was not devoutly religious, his family belonged to an Orthodox synagogue, and he had a bar mitzvah ceremony and attended a cheder. Both sides of his family were originally from Eastern Europe; his maternal grandparents were Polish Jews who settled in Ireland in the 1930s, while his paternal grandfather, after whom he was named, was surgeon Leonard Abrahamson, a Ukrainian Jew from Odesa. Abrahamson's mother was a childhood friend of the future President of Israel, Chaim Herzog; both were the children of Polish-Jewish immigrants to Ireland, and grew up on Bloomfield Avenue in Portobello.

He was educated at The High School and Trinity College Dublin, where he was elected a scholar in philosophy in 1988, having transferred after a year of studying theoretical physics.

Career
Abrahamson was offered a scholarship to study for a PhD in Philosophy in Stanford University. He abandoned his studies after six months and returned to Ireland to take up filmmaking, initially directing commercials, filming a popular series of adverts for Carlsberg. His first film was Adam & Paul, a black comedy that featured a pair of heroin addicts as they made their way around Dublin in search of a fix. The follow up film to this was 2007's Garage, starring Pat Shortt as a lonely petrol station attendant in rural Ireland. Both films won the IFTA award for best film. 

Also in 2007, RTÉ screened Abrahamson's four-part TV miniseries Prosperity, which was written in collaboration with Mark O'Halloran, the co-writer of Adam and Paul and Garage. Like these two films, Prosperity focused on people on the fringes of Irish society, with each one-hour episode focusing on a specific character, including an alcoholic, a single mother, and an asylum seeker. Prosperity was nominated for six Irish Film and Television Awards in 2008 and won in two categories, Best Directing for Lenny Abrahamson, and Best Script for Mark O'Halloran.

In 2012, he won his third IFTA for best film with What Richard Did.

Abrahamson revealed that he was working on a UK movie called Frank, which is set in Britain, Ireland, and the USA, in a December 2012 interview with Eurochannel. "It's a comedy about a young musician who joins an eccentric band led by an enigmatic singer called Frank. It's a kind of road movie, strange, funny and quite original, I hope. It stars Michael Fassbender and Domhnall Gleeson."

Abrahamson directed the film Frank, which premiered at Sundance Film Festival in January 2014. The film is about an eccentric musician modeled after Frank Sidebottom. It stars Michael Fassbender, Domhnall Gleeson and Maggie Gyllenhaal. He next directed the film adaptation of Emma Donoghue's novel, Room (2015), for which he received his first Academy Award nomination. The film was successful, both critically and commercially.

In 2014, it was announced that Abrahamson would direct an adaptation of Laird Hunt's Civil War novel Neverhome. In 2015, Abrahamson was working on A Man's World, a film based on Emile Griffith's boxing rivalry with Benny Paret.

In 2016, it was confirmed that Abrahamson is attached to direct Neal Bascomb's upcoming book The Grand Escape, a true story of three daredevil World War I pilots being held in Germany's most infamous POW prison. The story chronicles WWI's greatest mass prison escape, and the pilots' subsequent flight to freedom. A writer to adapt Bascomb's book has not yet been attached. Element Pictures and Film4 Productions are producing.

Personal life 
Abrahamson is married to Monika Pamula, a Polish-born film studies teacher; the couple have two children.

Abrahamson is an atheist.

Filmography

Films 
 3 Joes (1991; short film)
 Adam & Paul (2004)
 Garage (2007)
 What Richard Did (2012)
 Frank (2014)
 Room (2015)
 The Little Stranger (2018)

Television 
 Prosperity (2007)
 Chance (2016; 2 episodes; also executive producer)
 Normal People (2020; 6 episodes; also executive producer)
 Conversations with Friends (2022; 7 episodes; also executive producer)

Commercials
 Carlsberg (2006)
 Meteor (2009)

Awards and nominations
Academy Awards
 Best Director – Room (2015) — Nominated 

British Academy Television Awards
 British Academy Television Award for Best Mini-Series – Normal People - Nominated 

British Academy Television Craft Awards
 British Academy Television Craft Award for Best Director: Fiction – Normal People - Nominated 

Primetime Emmy Awards
 Outstanding Directing for a Limited Series, Movie, or Dramatic Special – Normal People: "Episode 5" (2020) — Nominated 

Irish Film & Television Awards
 Best Director for Film – Adam & Paul (2004) Winner
 Best Director for Film – Garage (2007) Winner
 Best Director for Film – What Richard Did (2012) Winner
 Best Director for Television - Prosperity (2007) Winner

Cannes Film Festival
 C.I.C.A.E. – Garage (2007)

Satellite Awards
 Best Director – Room — (2015) Nominated

References

External links

Interview with Lenny Abrahamson at Eurochannel

1966 births
Living people
Irish film directors
Irish television directors
Alumni of Trinity College Dublin
Scholars of Trinity College Dublin
Film people from Dublin (city)
Irish people of Polish-Jewish descent
Irish people of Ukrainian-Jewish descent
Irish atheists
Irish Jews
Jewish atheists
20th-century Irish people
21st-century Irish people
Stanford University people
Best Director Genie and Canadian Screen Award winners
People educated at The High School, Dublin
People from Rathfarnham